Carillon City is a major Australian shopping centre, located in Perth. It is located in the middle of the Perth main retail precinct between the Hay and Murray Street malls, at the southern end of Forrest Place. It is linked to St Georges Terrace by way of access through Trinity Arcade and an arcade under Hay Street Mall. Walkways and a pedestrian overpass connects the Cultural Centre, public carparks, the rail and bus terminal with Carillon City.  the centre is undergoing redevelopment, involving demolition of the existing centre.

History
Originally the centre was two individual arcades known as City Arcade and Carillon City. The then City Arcade was constructed in 1970 and refurbished in 1980. Carillon Arcade was opened in 1982.

Some of the original tenants were Miss Maud, Four Seasons and Sasellas Tavern, all of whom have remained at the same locations throughout all the changes undertaken to the centre.

Sometime in 1998, City Arcade was purchased by the Hawaiian Property Group and Multiplex Property Trust, and merged into what is now known as Carillon City. On the eastern side of the property resides a fourteen-story office block.

In 2016, property group Dexus bought the centre for $140 million at a yield of 5.47% for its Dexus Wholesale Property Fund.

On April 29, 2022 it was announced that Tattarang bought the centre.

Redevelopments
As part of the merger of the two arcades in 1998, extensive refurbishment works were undertaken to increase the aesthetic appeal of the new combined arcades.

In December 2013, the western end of the Carillon City site was demolished to make way for a new Topshop Topman store, which opened in October 2014. The store closed in July 2017, less than three years after opening amidst financial difficulties for the company in Australia. A Cotton On outlet currently occupies the space as of 2019.

In 2019 Dexus proposed a new redevelopment that would include a Hoyts cinema, a 24-storey mixed-use tower, and a 17-storey office and education building above the existing structure. On November 1, 2021, the centre closed for redevelopment except for a few stores located on the exterior of the centre.

On April 29, 2022 it was announced that Tattarang will transform Carillon City into a world-class retail and experiential precinct.

Architectural features
The centre gets its name from the Carillon Bells, a group of 35 bells launched in 1983 which play melodic sounds. Carillon City's carillon is one of only four carillons in Australia.

On the south-western side of the complex is a three-storey glass atrium with a two-storey glass spiral staircase between the first and second storeys.

Facilities

The fifth floor of the complex includes the Perth Tourists Lounge, targeted primarily at overseas visitors particularly from Asian destinations to relax while visiting and shopping within the city areas.

Transport
As the centre connects with two major pedestrian malls there is no direct transport to the location. However, the area is well serviced by bus links along St Georges Terrace, as well as services from the Perth Busport and the Elizabeth Quay Bus Station. Rail services are available from the nearby Perth railway station.

References

External links

Shopping centres in Perth, Western Australia
Shopping malls established in 1970
Forrest Place
Hay Street, Perth